John Arthur  Wright (25 November 1841 – 24 February 1920) was an Australian company manager, magistrate, Member of Upper House, public service head, rail/tramways engineer, railways commissioner and railways contractor. Wright was born in Dover, Kent, England and died in Albany, Western Australia.

See also

References

Australian businesspeople
Resident magistrates of Western Australia
Members of the Western Australian Legislative Council
Australian engineers
Australian Anglicans
English emigrants to Australia
1841 births
1920 deaths